Pseudicius ridicularis is a jumping spider species in the genus Pseudicius that lives in Ethiopia. It was first described in 2008.

References

Endemic fauna of Ethiopia
Salticidae
Fauna of Ethiopia
Spiders described in 2008
Spiders of Africa
Taxa named by Wanda Wesołowska